Glareadessus is a genus of beetles in the family Dytiscidae, containing the following species:

 Glareadessus franzi Wewalka & Biström, 1998
 Glareadessus stocki Wewalka & Biström, 1998

References

Dytiscidae